Joshua Love (born September 12, 1996) is an American football quarterback for the Michigan Panthers of the United States Football League (USFL). He played college football at San Jose State University.

Early life and high school
Love grew up in Mission Viejo, California, and initially attended Tesoro High School before transferring to Long Beach Polytechnic High School after his sophomore year. He shared snaps at quarterback during his junior year but finished the season with 17 touchdown passes to just two interceptions. As a senior, Love passed for 3,199 yards and 41 touchdowns as he led the Jackrabbits to an 11–2 record and was named the Moore League Offensive Player of the Year. Love was lightly recruited coming out of high school and committed to play college football at San Jose State University as a preferred walk-on.

College career
Love walked-on to the San Jose State Spartans football team and redshirted his true freshman season and was awarded a scholarship at the end of the year. He played in all 12 of SJSU's games the following season, serving as the holder on the field goal unit and throwing passes in five games with one start, completing 31 of 60 passes for 392 yards with two touchdowns and five interceptions. As a redshirt sophomore Love played in nine games with five starts, completing 54.1% of his passes for 928 yards and five touchdowns with seven interceptions. He became the Spartans' starting quarterback early during his redshirt junior season and finished the year with 1,963 yards and 14 touchdowns while completing 56.1% of his passes. Love started all of SJSU's games as a senior and was named the Mountain West Conference Player of the Week after completing 32 of 49 passes for 402 yards and two touchdowns in a 31–24 upset win over Arkansas. He finished the season with for 3,923 passing yards and 22 touchdowns with a 60.9% completion percentage and was named first-team All-Mountain West Conference and was the first Spartan to be named the conference Offensive Player of the Year since San Jose State joined the conference. Love finished his collegiate career with the third most passing yards in school history with 7,206 yards and seventh all-time with 43 touchdown passes.

College statistics

Professional career

Los Angeles Rams
Love signed with the Los Angeles Rams as an undrafted free agent on April 25, 2020, shortly after the conclusion of the 2020 NFL Draft. He was waived on August 25, 2020.

On May 4, 2021, Love received an invitation from the Cleveland Browns to their 2021 rookie mini camp.

Carolina Panthers
Love was signed to the Carolina Panthers practice squad on November 2, 2021. He was released on November 9.

Pittsburgh Maulers
Love was drafted in the 12th round of the 2022 USFL Draft by the Pittsburgh Maulers of the United States Football League (USFL). He was released on May 10, 2022.

Michigan Panthers
On May 10, 2022, Love was claimed off waivers by the Michigan Panthers of the United States Football League (USFL).

Statistics

References

External links

Los Angeles Rams bio
San Jose State Spartans bio

1996 births
Living people
Sportspeople from Mission Viejo, California
Players of American football from California
American football quarterbacks
San Jose State Spartans football players
Los Angeles Rams players
Carolina Panthers players
Pittsburgh Maulers (2022) players
Michigan Panthers (2022) players
Long Beach Polytechnic High School alumni